VAUDE is a German producer of mountain sports equipment. The head office is in Tettnang, Germany. It was founded in 1974 by Albrecht von Dewitz. The name of the firm is derived from the initials of its founder (V, D). The company is 100 percent family owned. In 2009, the management was handed over to his daughter Antje von Dewitz.

Products include tents, backpacks, and sleeping bags. There are 486 employees working in the head office in Germany. The corporate group also owns production facilities in Bỉm Sơn, Vietnam.

In 2006, Edelrid became a part of the Vaude Group. The brands Lucky (climbing supplies) and Markill (camping stoves) were integrated in the Edelrid brand in 2008. Markill was originally a brand of the company Marsteller & Killman founded in Thuringia in 1866 and established in Kettwig in 1907. Marsteller & Killman produced stoves, cooking utensils, food containers, and aluminum bottles. In 2017, the Vaude Group took over Red Chili, a producer mainly of climbing shoes and other climbing garments. Red Chili is now part of Edelrid.

VAUDE is the official outfitter of the climbing association German Alpine Club since 2002.

Corporate social responsibility and environmental protection
In 2014, VAUDE published its first corporate responsibility report established in accordance with the guidelines of the Global Reporting Initiative.
Since 2010, the company is a member of the Fair Wear Foundation, an organisation which is seeking to improve working conditions in the textile industry. To ensure a manufacturing process which is as environmentally friendly and safe as possible, VAUDE applies the bluesign production standard. The company headquarter in Tettnang is climate neutral.

In 2015, VAUDE was one of six companies nominated for the Financial Times' Boldness in Business Award in the category Corporate Responsibility/Environment. At the end of the year, VAUDE has won the first place in the category Germany's Most Sustainable Brand of the German Sustainability Award. VAUDE obtained numerous further awards in the area of environmental protection and sustainability.

Regional activities include the running of the company-owned creche for about 30 children, and the take over of the local public swimming pool, to save it from being closed.

VAUDE recommends and is a reseller of Nikwax detergents and waterproofing products which are environmentally friendly because they are water-based, solvent-free and fluorocarbon-free (without the GHS09: Environmental hazard symbol).

Largely adhering to the Economy for the Common Good, VAUDE publishes an additional balance sheet based on its criteria.

In 2019, VAUDE was among the first batch of companies to obtain the newly created Green Button which is an official certificate bestowed by the German government to indicate high ecological and social standards.

The company is a supporter of the foundation Development and Climate Alliance which helps companies and other organisations in becoming climate neutral. The company has achieved complete climate neutrality at the beginning of 2022.

VAUDE Academy
The VAUDE Academy for sustainable business offers consulting services to companies that want to become more sustainable or develop a sustainble business. During the first two years of its existence, the Academy is being supported by the German Federal Environmental Foundation.

Support for refugee employees
Vaude is one of the founding companies of the association Bleiberecht durch Arbeit (Right of Residence through Work), established in 2018, which promotes the granting of right of residence for refugees with permanent employment contract. Due to the scarcity of skilled labour, Vaude would suffer considerable economic damage had their refugee employees to return to their countries of origin. Numerous companies face the same problems and thus joined the association.

Gallery

VAUDE-sponsored athletes (past and present)
VAUDE-sponsored teams, athletes and events include:
 since 2021: Team TREK|VAUDE as mountainbike team
 in 2021: BANFF Mountain film festival world tour
Aline Bock (freeride snowboarder)
Team Colnago (cycle sport), including Eva Lechner
Team Centurion VAUDE (cycle sport)
Angela Eiter (climbing world cup champion)
Kilian Fischhuber (bouldering world cup champion)

References

External links

Companies based in Baden-Württemberg
Outdoor clothing brands
Climbing and mountaineering equipment companies
Manufacturing companies established in 1974
Camping equipment manufacturers
Sportswear brands
1974 establishments in West Germany
German brands